KADD (93.5 FM) is a radio station broadcasting an Regional Mexican (Spanish) format. Licensed to Logandale, Nevada, United States, it serves the Las Vegas Valley. The station is owned by Eric Palacios' Radio Activo Broadcasting, through licensee Radio Activo 2 LLC.

External links
Murphy Broadcasting

Radio stations established in 1993
1993 establishments in Nevada
ADD
Regional Mexican radio stations in the United States
Spanish-language radio stations in the United States